"Pop Culture" is a mash-up song created by Hugo Pierre Leclercq, better known by his stage name, Madeon. The song was recorded on-the-fly by Leclercq, when he was seventeen years old, using samples from 39 popular songs, mixed using software FL Studio controlled with a Novation Launchpad. Leclercq recorded a video of him creating the mix which he uploaded to YouTube on 11 July 2011. The video went viral within a few days, and since has seen more than 56 million views. The video drew attention to Leclercq and would lead to him being signed by Columbia Records and launching his music career.

Composition

At the time of recording the song, Leclercq was 16, living with his parents in Nantes, France. Leclercq (at the time, using only his Madeon stage name) was a rising star in the EDM genre, having recently won a remix competition for the song "The Island" by Pendulum in late 2010. He subsequently developed remixes for songs by Alphabeat, deadmau5, and Yelle, with the last two publicly praising Leclercq's remixes.

Leclercq described the concept for "Pop Culture" as wanting to show the process that electronic mix artists use during live performances. Leclercq stated, "When you go see an electro band, we do not really know what they do on stage." Daft Punk had been a major influence for Leclercq, and had gone to their shows to see how they performed their music live, seeing that they were often just pressing buttons on their panels to make sound. 

Subsequently, Leclercq saw an advertisement for the Launchpad, and purchased one. To toy around with it, he pulled samples from his favorite albums and songs at the time.  Eventually he had extracts from 39 different songs, which included:

 Alphabeat – "Boyfriend"
 Alphabeat – "Fascination"
 Bag Raiders – "Shooting Stars"
 The Black Eyed Peas – "I Gotta Feeling"
 Britney Spears – "...Baby One More Time"
 Capsule – "Can I Have a Word"
 Chromeo – "Mamma's Boy"
 Coldplay – "Viva la Vida"
 Daft Punk – "Aerodynamic"
 Daft Punk – "Around the World"
 deadmau5 – "Raise Your Weapon" 
 deadmau5 – "Right this Second"
 Ellie Goulding – "Starry Eyed"
 Electric Light Orchestra – "Mr. Blue Sky"
 Girls Aloud – "Biology"
 Gorillaz – "Dare"
 Gossip – "Heavy Cross" 
 Gwen Stefani – "What You Waiting For?" 
 Housse de Racket – "Oh Yeah"
 Justice – "DVNO"
 Justice – "Phantom Part II"
 Katy Perry – "One of the Boys"
 Kesha – "Take It Off"
 Kylie Minogue – "Wow"
 Lady Gaga – "Alejandro"
 Linkin Park – "Crawling"
 Madonna – "Hung Up"
 Martin Solveig  – "Boys and Girls"
 Michael Jackson – "Billie Jean"
 Nero – "Me and You"
 OneRepublic – "All the Right Moves" 
 One-T – "The Magic Key"
 Ratatat – "Shempi"
 Solange – "I Decided" 
 Stardust – "Music Sounds Better with You"
 The Buggles – "Video Killed the Radio Star"
 The Killers – "Losing Touch"
 The Who – "Baba O'Riley" 
 Yelle – "Que Veux Tu" 

He created the video live as he performed the song, uploaded to YouTube, and then left on vacation for about a week. When he returned, he found the video had millions of views, and he had a request to tour Australia.  Due to the attention he received from "Pop Culture" and subsequent singles, Leclercq was approached by various record labels to sign up as an artist.

The song was put into dance form by comedian Nathan Barnatt and uploaded to YouTube in August 2011.

References

External links
 

2011 singles
2011 songs
Madeon songs
Electronic dance music songs
Mashup songs
Song recordings produced by Madeon
Songs written by Madeon
Viral videos